Pouteria lucuma is a species of tree in the family Sapotaceae, cultivated for its fruit, the lúcuma. It is native to the Andean valleys of Bolivia, Chile, Ecuador, and Peru.

Description 
This evergreen tree is up to 20 m tall, and has greyish-brown, fissured bark, which produces a milky white exudate. The end of branchlets and the petioles are covered with short, brown hairs. The leaves are simple, oblanceolate to elliptical, up to 25 cm long and 10 cm wide, and glabrous (or sometimes slightly hairy on the underside) grouped at the end of the branches. Flowers are solitary or in fascicles, small, axillary, with hairy sepals and a corolla forming a tube 1.0-1.8 cm long, greenish white, with five lobes, five stamens, five staminodes, a pubescent ovary, and a style 0.8-1.5 cm long. The fruit is globose, 6–12 cm long, glabrous, and russet to yellow when mature; the pulp is bright yellow; the one to several seeds are 1.8-3.5 cm long, dark brown, and glossy.

History

Representations of lúcuma have been found on ceramics at burial sites of the indigenous people of coastal Peru. The Moche people had a fascination with agriculture and often chose to represent fruits and vegetables, including lúcuma, in their art.

The fruit was first seen and reported by Europeans in Ecuador in 1531.

Distribution and habitat 

Cultivation
In addition to Peru, the fruit is grown also to a limited extent in Bolivia, Chile and Costa Rica.  Attempts at growing lúcuma in Florida's climate are typically not successful. The fruit is successfully grown in Vietnam, where it is known as lêkima.

In Peru, harvesting season is from October to March and in Chile from June to November.

Uses
When eaten raw, the very sweet fruit is bright yellow and has a mealy and dry texture. In Peru, it is more commonly used as a flavor in juice, milk shakes, and especially ice cream. Its unique flavor in such preparations has been described variously as being similar to sweet potato, maple syrup, or butterscotch. In Peru, manjar de lúcuma (dulce de leche with lúcuma purée) is a dessert. Multiple sources describe it as the most popular ice cream flavor in Peru  and one of the most popular fresh fruits.

Nutrition

Lúcuma pulp has a 64-72% moisture content. The pulp also contains glucose, fructose, sucrose, inositol, citric acid, and succinic acid. However, only limited nutritional information is available for lúcuma powder, indicating moderate content of protein and iron, each providing 14% of the Daily Value in a 100-g (3.5 oz) serving, which supplies 420 Calories.

References

External links
 
 Lúcuma at bioversityinternational.org

Crops originating from Ecuador
Crops originating from Peru
Crops originating from Chile
Peruvian cuisine
lucuma
Trees of Peru
Trees of Ecuador